The Gloria Patri, also known as the Glory Be to the Father or, colloquially, the Glory Be, is a doxology, a short hymn of praise to God in various Christian liturgies. It is also referred to as the Minor Doxology (Doxologia Minor) or Lesser Doxology, to distinguish it from the Greater Doxology, the Gloria in Excelsis Deo.

The earliest Christian doxologies are addressed to the Father "through" (διὰ) the Son, or to the Father and the Holy Spirit with (μετά) the Son, or to the Son with (σύν) the Father and the Holy Spirit.

The Trinitarian doxology addressed in parallel fashion to all three Divine Persons of the Trinity, joined by and (καί), as in the form of baptism, Matthew 28:19, became universal in Nicaean Christianity, which was established as the official faith of the Church with the Edict of Thessalonica in 380.

Greek version

The Greek wording is as follows:

, 

Glory be to the Father
Glory to the Father, and to the Son, and to the Holy Spirit, 
Both now and always, and unto the ages of ages. Amen.

The second part is occasionally slightly modified and other verses are sometimes introduced between the two halves.

Syriac version
East Syriac (used by the Assyrian Church of the East and the Chaldean Catholic Church)

Malabar East Syriac (used by the Syro Malabar Church)

West Syriac (used by the Syriac Orthodox Church and the Syriac Catholic Church)

Glory be to the Father and to the Son and to the Holy Spirit,
from everlasting and for ever and ever (literal translation)

According to Worship Music: A Concise Dictionary, the lesser doxology is of Syrian origin.

There is an alternate version which the Syriac Orthodox Church and Syriac Catholic Church use in their liturgies:

Glory be to the Father and to the Son and to the Holy Spirit,
And upon us, weak and sinful, may mercy and compassion be showered, in both worlds, forever and ever. Amen.

Arabic

Arabic is one of the official liturgical languages of the Church of Jerusalem and the Church of Antioch, both autocephalous Orthodox Churches and two of the four ancient Patriarchates of the Pentarchy.

The Arabic wording of this doxology is as follows:

Roman Rite Latin version

Gloria Patri, et Filio, et Spiritui Sancto,
Sicut erat in principio, et nunc, et semper, et in sæcula sæculorum. Amen.

Glory to the Father, and to the Son, and to the Holy Spirit,
As it was in the beginning, is now, and ever shall be, world without end. Amen.

This differs from the Greek version because of the insertion of "sicut erat in principio", which is now taken to mean "as it (glory) was in the beginning", but which seems originally to have meant "as he (the Son) was in the beginning", and echo of the opening words of the Gospel according to John: "In the beginning was the Word".

In 529, the Second Synod of Vasio in Gaul said in its fifth canon that the second part of the doxology, with the words "sicut erat in principio", was used in Rome, the East, and Africa, and ordered it to be said likewise in Gaul. Writing in the 1909 Catholic Encyclopedia, Adrian Fortescue, while remarking that what the synod said of the East was false, took the synod's decree to mean that the form originally used in the West was the same as the Greek form. From about the 7th century, the present Roman Rite version became almost universal throughout the West.

Mozarabic Rite Latin version

Gloria et honor Patri et Filio et Spiritui sancto
in sæcula sæculorum.

Glory and honour to the Father and to the Son and to the Holy Spirit
for ages of ages.

The similarity between this version used in the then extreme west of the Church and the Syriac version used in the extreme east is noteworthy.

English versions
The following traditional form is the most common in Anglican usage and in older Lutheran liturgical books:
Glory be to the Father, and to the Son:
and to the Holy Ghost;
As it was in the beginning, is now, and ever shall be:
world without end. Amen.

The translations of "semper" as "ever shall be", and "in saecula saeculorum" as "world without end" date at least from Thomas Cranmer's Book of Common Prayer.

The Catholic Church uses the same English form, but today replaces "Holy Ghost" with "Holy Spirit", as in The Divine Office the edition of the Liturgy of the Hours used in most English-speaking countries outside the United States. Divine Worship: The Missal, published by the Holy See in 2015 for use under the Apostolic Constitution Anglicanorum Coetibus allows "Holy Spirit" and "Holy Ghost" to be used interchangeably.

In 1971, the International Consultation on English Texts (ICET) used since 1971:
Glory to the Father, and to the Son, and to the Holy Spirit:
as it was in the beginning, is now, and will be for ever. Amen.

This was adopted in the publication, Liturgy of the Hours (Catholic Book Publishing Company), but has not come into popular use by lay Catholics. It is found also in some Anglican and Lutheran publications.

A variant found in Common Worship has "will" instead of "shall":
Glory to the Father and to the Son
and to the Holy Spirit;
as it was in the beginning is now
and will be for ever. Amen.

Especially in Anglican circles, there are various alternative forms of the Gloria designed to avoid masculine language. The form included in Celebrating Common Prayer is:
Glory to God, Source of all being,
Eternal Word and Holy Spirit;
as it was in the beginning is now
and shall be for ever. Amen.

The doxology in the use of the English-speaking Orthodox and Greek-Catholic Churches, follows the Greek form, of which one English translation is:
Glory to the Father and the Son and the Holy Spirit,
now and forever and to the ages of ages. Amen.

The translation of the Greek form used by the Melkite Greek Catholic Church in the United States is:
Glory be to the Father, and to the Son, and to the Holy Spirit,
now and always and forever and ever. Amen.

Use

Eastern Churches
In the Eastern Orthodox Church, Oriental Orthodoxy, the Church of the East, and the Eastern Catholic Churches, the Lesser Doxology is frequently used at diverse points in services and private prayers. Among other instances, it is said three times by the reader during the usual beginning of every service, and as part of the dismissal at the end. When it is used in a series of hymns it is chanted either before the last hymn or before the penultimate hymn. In the latter case, it is divided in half, the "Glory..." being chanted before the penultimate hymn, and "Both now..." being chanted before the final hymn (which is usually a Theotokion).

Western Churches
In the Roman Rite, the Gloria Patri is frequently chanted or recited in the Liturgy of the Hours principally at the end of psalms and canticles and in the responsories. There are a few exceptions: for the canticle in the Book of Daniel, Chapter 3 (The Prayer of Azariah and Song of the Three Holy Children), the Gloria Patri is not chanted; rubrics in the liturgical books direct that: In fine huius cantici non dicitur Gloria Patri ("at the end of this canticle the Gloria Patri is not to be said"). Instead, the phrase "Praise him, and magnify him forever" is used.

The Gloria Patri also figures in the Introit of the Latin Mass. It is also present in the Introit in the form of the Roman Rite published in Divine Worship: The Missal. The prayer also figures prominently in pious devotions, notably the rosary, where it is recited at the end of each decade.

Amongst Anglicans, the Gloria Patri is mainly used at the Daily Offices of Morning and Evening Prayer, to introduce and conclude the singing or recitation of psalms, and to conclude the canticles that lack their own concluding doxologies.

Lutherans have historically added the Gloria Patri both after the chanting of the Responsorial Psalm and following the Nunc Dimittis during their Divine Service, as well as during Matins and Vespers in the Canonical hours. In Methodism, the Gloria Patri (usually in the traditional English form above) is frequently sung to conclude the "responsive reading" of the psalms as they are set out for congregational reading. The prayer is also frequently used in evangelical Presbyterian churches.

See also
Greater doxology

References

External links 
"Doxology" at New Advent
Glory Be
 The Glory Be and other prayers of the Rosary in many languages
 A website with the Lord's Prayer in multiple languages; some of the languages also have the Glory Be
 Audio recordings and texts of the Gloria Patri and other prayers in various languages

Christian prayer
Christian worship and liturgy
Rosary